Kalateh-ye Gurni (also Romanized as Kalāteh-ye Gūrnī) is a village in Miankuh Rural District, Chapeshlu District, Dargaz County, Razavi Khorasan Province, Iran. At the 2006 census, its population was 45, in 13 families.

References 

Populated places in Dargaz County